Nebraska is a 2013 American black and white comedy-drama film directed by Alexander Payne and written by Bob Nelson. It follows two Montana residents (Bruce Dern and Will Forte), who take a road trip to Nebraska to claim a fortune. The film premiered at the Cannes Film Festival on August 28, 2013, where it competed for the Palme d'Or. It was released on November 15, 2013 in the United States. Nebraska has earned over $17 million at the box office.

The film gathered various awards and nominations following its release, ranging from recognition of the film itself to Nelson's screenplay, the direction and the cast's acting performances, particularly those of Dern and June Squibb. At the 86th Academy Awards, Nebraska received six nominations. The film earned nine nominations from the Alliance of Women Film Journalists. The American Film Institute included Nebraska on their annual Top Ten Films of the Year list. The film garnered 6 nominations at the 19th Critics' Choice Awards, while earning three nominations from the Boston Society of Film Critics, British Academy Film Awards and Chicago Film Critics Association. Cinematographer Phedon Papamichael was nominated for the Golden Frog award from the Camerimage. Nebraska received five nominations at the 71st Golden Globe Awards, including Best Director and Best Musical or Comedy Motion Picture.

At the 29th Independent Spirit Awards, Nebraska gathered six nominations in categories, including Best Feature and Best First Screenplay. Squibb was nominated for Best Supporting Actress at the Los Angeles Film Critics Association, where Dern won Best Actor. The National Board of Review awarded Dern and Forte the Best Actor and Best Supporting Actor accolades respectively. Nebraska was named one of the Top Ten Films. The San Francisco Film Critics Circle bestowed six nominations on the film. The film's cast received the award for Best Ensemble in a Motion Picture at the 18th Satellite Awards. Both Dern and Squibb were nominated in the Best Actor and Best Supporting Actress categories. They also earned nominations at the Screen Actors Guild Awards. Squibb was nominated for Best Supporting Actress in three other circles. Nebraska gathered nine nominations from the St. Louis Gateway Film Critics Association and won the FIPRESCI Award at the 2013 Stockholm International Film Festival. Most recently, the film was nominated for Best Original Screenplay by the Writers Guild of America.

Awards and nominations

References
General

Specific

External links
 

Lists of accolades by film